Motionless Hour is the second release by Long Beach, California band, Repeater—their first, not including the 2005 demo.  Coming from an eight-song session intended to be a full-length album, the band decided to split up the tracks and release two separate EPs. The second EP remains unreleased at this time.

Singer, Steve Krolikowski compares this album to Scary Monsters (And Super Creeps) by David Bowie.

Track listing 
 "Diamond Ceiling" (4:52)
 "Painless" (3:47)
 "The Time Apart" (3:08)
 "Carved in Shadows" (4:36)

Personnel
Steve Krolikowski (vocals and guitar)
Rob Wallace (keyboards)
Victor Cuevas (bass)
Alex Forsythe (guitar)
Matt Hanief (drums)

References

External links 
 Repeater, office website
Repeater, on Facebook
Repeater, on MySpace

2007 EPs
Repeater (band) albums